Ricky Clint Gabriel (born 24 June 1991) is an English footballer who plays as a full-back. In September 2019, Gabriel received a 14 year prison sentence for firearms offences.

Career
Gabriel began his senior career in 2012 at Antigua Barracuda in the USL Pro when he started an away game at Pittsburgh Riverhounds on 28 July. He made four appearances before being released at the end of the season. Gabriel then joined Dover Athletic, but only made appearances in the Kent Senior Cup and joined Spartan South Midlands Football League side Brimsdown for 2014-15. After three goals in eleven games, Gabriel joined Enfield Town in January 2015. After two-and-a-half seasons, Gabriel joined Braintree Town in summer 2017, and was part of the team that won the National League South playoffs in his first season. Gabriel played 30 times for the Iron in the National League the following season before joining Maidenhead United in March 2019.

Career statistics

Personal life
Gabriel is a triplet and his brothers Ralston and Reiss are also footballers. The brothers have played together at Brimsdown and Enfield Town.

On 6 September 2019, at Blackfriars Crown Court, Gabriel was found guilty of conspiracy to possess firearms and ammunition with intent to endanger life in July and jailed for 14 years, alongside his brothers Ralston and Reiss.

References

External links
 
 Ricky Gabriel at Football Database
 Ricky Gabriel at Aylesbury United

1991 births
Living people
Triplets
English footballers
Footballers from Bradford
Association football defenders
Antigua Barracuda F.C. players
Dover Athletic F.C. players
Brimsdown F.C. players
Enfield Town F.C. players
Braintree Town F.C. players
Maidenhead United F.C. players
USL Championship players
National League (English football) players
Isthmian League players
English expatriate footballers
Expatriate footballers in Antigua and Barbuda